Ilavarasi or Elavarasi is a 2010 Indian Tamil-language soap opera that aired Monday through Saturday on Sun TV from 18 January 2010 to 1 November 2014 at 1:30PM IST for 1263 episodes. It had been receiving the highest ratings of Tamil serials and received high praising from viewers.

The show starred Santhoshi, Shrikar, Rachitha Rachu, Subhalekha Sudhakar, Arun Kumar,  Anuradha Krishnamoorthy and among others. It was produced by Radaan Mediaworks Raadhika and director by N.Santanam, O.N Rathnam, M.K Arunthavaraja and Sulaiman K.Babu. It also airs in London Tamil Channel on IBC Tamil from 2016.

Plot
The story about Elavarasi (Santhoshi), a hard working woman who is the daughter of a carpenter. Born in a poor background with meager means, she works hard and overcomes unforeseen hurdles and obstacles in life and still takes good care of her family
Illavarasi is a kind-hearted woman who comes from humble beginnings. The serial shows the family drama where the protagonist has to overcome unforeseen obstacles and still take care of her family.

Cast

Main cast

Recurring cast

Awards and nominations

See also
 List of programs broadcast by Sun TV

References

External links
 Official Website 
 Sun TV on YouTube
 Sun TV Network 
 Sun Group 

Sun TV original programming
2010 Tamil-language television series debuts
Tamil-language television shows
2014 Tamil-language television series endings
2010s Tamil-language television series